The Mayor of Zalamea is a 1920 German silent drama film directed by Ludwig Berger and starring Lil Dagover, Albert Steinrück and Agnes Straub. The film was based on Pedro Calderón de la Barca's historic Spanish play of the same name. It was shot at the Babelsberg Studios in Berlin with sets designed by the art director Hermann Warm. It was Berger's debut as a director.

Cast
 Lil Dagover as Isabel
 Albert Steinrück as Pedro Crespo
 Agnes Straub as Chispa
 Elisabeth Horn as Ines
 Lothar Müthel as Juan
 Heinrich Witte as Don Alvaro
 Max Schreck as Don Mendo
 Ernst Legal as Sergeant
 Ernst Rotmund as Rebolledo
 Hermann Vallentin
 Armin Schweizer
 Helmuth Krüger

References

Bibliography
 Hardt, Ursula. From Caligari to California: Erich Pommer's Life in the International Film Wars. Berghahn Books, 1996.

External links

1920 films
Films of the Weimar Republic
German silent feature films
German historical drama films
1920s historical drama films
Films directed by Ludwig Berger
Films set in Spain
German films based on plays
Films based on works by Pedro Calderón de la Barca
Films set in the 16th century
German black-and-white films
Films produced by Erich Pommer
1920 drama films
Silent drama films
1920s German films
Films shot at Babelsberg Studios
1920s German-language films